Commitment is a 2017 Gujarati drama film starring Manas Shah & Maulika Patel in lead roles. The film is directed by Atul Patel and written/produced by Manoj Patel. The film was released on 16 June 2017.

Plot 
This film exposes the scams prevailing in pharmaceutical world; how people pursuing medical profession make money at the cost of poor patients. Though this movie brings up an important issue of corruption in the country, its elements of comedy and romance make it perfect entertainer.

Cast 

 Manas Shah as Raj Mehta
 Maulika Patel as Priya

Production

Development 
The film is produced by Manoj Patel from Siddhivinayak Film Creation House after the research on subject for 3 years. Most of the shooting of the film is done in Ahmedabad & Bhavnagar.

Soundtrack 
Nishit Mehta and Krupesh Thacker composed the songs of the film and the lyrics are penned by Chirag Tripathi, Ankit Trivedi, Milind Gadhavi & Krupesh Thacker. The music is launched by Krup Music.

Reception 
Commitment received mixed reviews from critics; The Times of India gave 2.5/5 stars while the user review on site is 2.9/5 based on 69 user ratings. The movie is appreciated for its brave attempt to show the different subject in Gujarati cinema. It got critics rating of 2.5/5 and user rating of 4.2/5 based on 857 votes on Book My Show site.

References 

2017 films
Films shot in India
Films set in Ahmedabad
Films shot in Ahmedabad
Films shot in Gujarat
2010s Gujarati-language films